Italcar is an Italian company, located in Turin, which produces and distributes electric vehicles.

Description
The vehicles carried by Italcar range from golf carts to utility to neighborhood electric vehicles. The vehicles can be used for luggage, as a shuttle, maintenance, or for recreational activities like golf.

References

External links 

 Official website

Quadricycles
Turin motor companies
Electric vehicle manufacturers of Italy